One Nation Crew (also 1NC) was a gospel vocal group assembled by Kirk Franklin for a full-length album and tour. The group had ten members of various musical backgrounds. They were first featured on the album The Nu Nation Project on some of the tracks. The next album they were on, Kirk Franklin Presents 1NC (B-Rite Music, 2000), was produced by Franklin and Al West, and reached #58 on the Billboard 200. The group performed at the Apollo Theater, at the Grammy Awards, the Essence Awards, and Motown Live in 2000-01. They also sung background on the album The Rebirth Kirk Franklin which was recorded the same year as they toured.

Members
Kirk Franklin
Markita Knight
Jana Bell
Candy West
Ashley Guilbert
Sheila Ingram
Brandon Kizer
Nate Larson
Frank Lawson
Shantael Johnson
Nate Young
Myron Butler
Farrell Mannings
Shanika Leeks

References

American gospel musical groups
Christian contemporary R&B groups
GospoCentric artists